Klára Engi (born November 1, 1967) is a retired Hungarian ice dancer. She competed with Attila Tóth. Together, they placed 16th at the 1984 Winter Olympics, 7th at the 1988 Winter Olympics, and 7th at the 1992 Winter Olympics. Their highest placement at the World Figure Skating Championships was 4th, which they achieved in 1989. Their highest placement at the European Figure Skating Championships was 4th, which they achieved in 1989, 1990, and 1991.

Engi was born in Budapest. She works as a coach and choreographer. Her clients include Jacqueline Voll, Josip Gluhak, and Nathalie van Uffelen

Results
(ice dance with Attila Tóth)

References
 Skatabase: 1980s Olympics
 Skatabase: 1990s Olympics

Navigation

Hungarian female ice dancers
Olympic figure skaters of Hungary
Figure skaters at the 1984 Winter Olympics
Figure skaters at the 1988 Winter Olympics
Figure skaters at the 1992 Winter Olympics
1967 births
Living people